Peterson Bryant ″Pete″ Jarman (October 31, 1892 – February 17, 1955) was a U.S. Representative from Alabama.

Early life
Born in Greensboro, Alabama, Jarman attended the public schools, the Normal College, Livingston, Alabama, and Southern University, Greensboro, Alabama. He graduated from the University of Alabama in 1913, and attended the University of Montpellier, France, in 1919, after which he served as clerk in probate office in Sumter County, Alabama, from 1913 to 1917.

Military career
During the First World War, Jarman served overseas as second and first lieutenant in the 327th Infantry Regiment. He served in the Alabama National Guard as inspector general with rank of major in 1922–1924, and as division inspector of the 31st Infantry Division with rank of lieutenant colonel in 1924–1940.

Political career
Jarman served as assistant State examiner of accounts in 1919–1930, and as Secretary of State of Alabama in 1931–1934. He served as assistant State comptroller in 1935 and 1936. He was a member of the State Democratic executive committee of Alabama in 1927–1930.

Jarman was elected as a Democrat to the Seventy-fifth and to the five succeeding Congresses (January 3, 1937 – January 3, 1949). He served as chairman of the Committee on Memorials (Seventy-fifth Congress). He was an unsuccessful candidate for renomination in 1948.

A confidential 1943 analysis of the House Foreign Affairs Committee by Isaiah Berlin for the British Foreign Office described Jarman as

He was appointed by President Harry S. Truman as Ambassador to Australia on June 8, 1949, and served until July 31, 1953. He died in Washington, D.C., on February 17, 1955, and was interred in Arlington National Cemetery.

References

External links

1892 births
1955 deaths
People from Greensboro, Alabama
University of Alabama alumni
Secretaries of State of Alabama
Ambassadors of the United States to Australia
American military personnel of World War I
Burials at Arlington National Cemetery
United States Army officers
Democratic Party members of the United States House of Representatives from Alabama
20th-century American politicians